Mellon Charles is a remote crofting village on the north east shore of Loch Ewe in Achnasheen, Ross-shire Scottish Highlands and is in the Scottish council area of Highland.

The village of Ormiscaig is located less than one mile along the coast road.

References

Populated places in Ross and Cromarty